Sven Oskar Albin Andersson (14 February 1907 – 30 May 1981) was a Swedish football defender and bandy player. He played for Sweden in the 1934 FIFA World Cup. He also played for AIK Fotboll.

References

External links
FIFA profile

1907 births
1981 deaths
Swedish footballers
Swedish bandy players
Sweden international footballers
Association football defenders
Allsvenskan players
AIK Fotboll players
AIK Bandy players
1934 FIFA World Cup players